Prahlad Rai Agarwala is an Indian business man based in Kolkata, West Bengal, engaged in the manufacturing and export of a range of clothing and other products including inner wear, casual  wear, kids wear, winter wear and footwear. The "Rupa" brand of knit wear owned by the hosiery company Rupa & Company Ltd. founded by Prahlad Rai Agarwala along with Ghanshyam Prasad Agarwala and Kunj Bihari Agarwal in 1968 is one of India's largest knitwear brand.

Agarwala holds a bachelor's degree in law from University of Calcutta. He is also the Honorary Consul of Republic of Columbia. Agarwala was awarded the lifetime achievement award in the 7th Reid & Taylor awards for retail excellence organized by the Asia Retail Congress, 2011.

In the year 2022, Govt of India conferred the Padma Shri award, the third highest award in the Padma series of awards, on Prahlad Rai Agarwala for his distinguished service in the field of trade and industry. The award is in recognition of his service as a "textile business leader, flag bearer of Make in India running Rupa & Co, one of India's largest clothing manufacturer and exporter".

References

Recipients of the Padma Shri
Indian businesspeople in textiles
Indian industrialists
Indian company founders
20th-century Indian businesspeople
Year of birth missing (living people)
Living people